The Avilés International Cinema and Architecture Festival (Spanish: Festival Internacional de Cine y Arquitectura) (FICARQ) takes places in Avilés, Asturias and it is the only festival about the subject in Spain. Its main aim is to show the links between cinema and architecture

History 
It takes places in Avilés, where the Centro Niemeyer is located. This is the only work in Spain of the famous Brazilian architect Oscar Niemeyer.

Cinema, conferences, performances, children workshop, micro-films contest and ball dance are the activities of the FICARQ

References

External links 
Official website
Centro Niemeyer
Avilés Town Hall

Avilés
Architecture festivals
Film festivals in Spain
Architecture film festivals